Stefan Zelimir Antonijevic (born 24 January 1989) is a Serbian-American footballer who plays for Øygarden. He previously played for Lillestrøm and Sogndal also in the Norwegian Eliteserien.

Career

Youth and college
Antonijevic began his college soccer career at Marquette University in 2007, before transferring to Valparaiso University in 2009. In 2008, Antonijevic played for the Chicago Fire SC youth team that won the national USL Super-20 championship.

Professional
On 17 January 2012 Antonijevic was selected by Sporting Kansas City in the 3rd round (No. 43 overall) of the 2012 MLS Supplemental Draft.

After trialling in Serbia and Croatia, Antonijevic returned to the United States and signed for NASL club Fort Lauderdale Strikers on 27 March 2013.

Antonijevic moved to rival Florida club Tampa Bay Rowdies on 7 January 2015. Antonijevic played 1,823 minutes in 21 games for the Rowdies in 2015 and was named to the NASL Team of the Week four times, more often than any other Rowdies player. On 22 December 2015, the Rowdies signed the towering center back to a fresh contract good through the 2016 season, with an option for 2017.

On 21 January 2019, Antonijevic signed with Sogndal on a two-year contract.

Honours

Lillestrøm
Norwegian Football Cup (1): 2017

References

1989 births
Living people
American soccer players
Serbian footballers
Marquette Golden Eagles men's soccer players
Valparaiso Crusaders men's soccer players
Vermont Voltage players
Fort Lauderdale Strikers players
Tampa Bay Rowdies players
Lillestrøm SK players
Sogndal Fotball players
Øygarden FK players
Eliteserien players
Norwegian First Division players
Association football defenders
Soccer players from Illinois
Sporting Kansas City draft picks
USL League Two players
North American Soccer League players
Serbia youth international footballers
Serbian expatriate footballers
Expatriate footballers in Norway
American people of Serbian descent